Table apples (also known as dessert apples or eating apples) are a group of apple cultivars grown for eating raw as opposed to cooking or cidermaking.  Table apples are usually sweet and the most prized exhibit particular aroma variations that differentiate them from other apples. D = Dual purpose (cooking + table)

Common table apple varieties include:
Adams Pearmain
Allington Pippin
Ambrosia 
Anna
Baldwin
 Belle de Boskoop D
 Black Twig D
Blenheim Orange
Cameo
Clivia
Cortland D
Cox Orange Pippin
Delbarestivale
 Delicious
Dorsett Golden
Elstar
Empire
Enterprise
Envy
Esopus Spitzenburg D
Fuji
Fiesta 
Fresco(syn. Wellant)
Gala
Ginger Gold
Golden Reinette
Granny Smith
Gravenstein D
 Grimes Golden D
Holsteiner Cox
Honeycrisp
 Idared D
Ingrid Marie
James Grieve
Jerseymac
Jonagold
Jonathan D
Kanzy(syn. Nicoter)
Katy
Kidd's Orange Red
King of the Pippins D
 Landsberger
Laxton's Superb
Lord Lambourne
Melrose
McIntosh
Melba
 Mollies Delicious
Mutsu D
Newtown Pippin
 Northern Spy
 Ontario
Paulared D
Pinova
Pristine apple
Ralls Janet
Red Delicious
Reinette du Canada
Ribston Pippin
Rome Beauty
Santana
 Spartan D
Stayman (apple)
Sturmer Pippin D
Sunset
Suntan
Tentation
Tolman Sweet
Topaz
 Tydemans Early Worcester
 Welthy D
Winesap D
 Winter Banana D
Worcester Pearmain
 Wyken Pippin
 Yellow Newtown D
 Yellow Transparent D
York Imperial D

See also
 Table grape

Apples